Ericydeus viridans is a species of the true weevil family from Mexico.

Description 
This beetle is brownish to greenish with faint striping and spotting.

References 

Entiminae
Beetles described in 1840